Roosevelt Station can refer to:

Central at Roosevelt (METRO Light Rail station), a station on the METRO Light Rail in Phoenix, Arizona, United States
Franklin D. Roosevelt (Paris Métro) a station on the Paris Métro in Paris, France
Roosevelt station (CTA), a station on the Chicago 'L' in Chicago, Illinois, United States
Roosevelt (Tren Urbano station), a station on the Tren Urbano in San Juan, Puerto Rico, United States
Roosevelt station (LRT), a station on the Manila Light Rail Transit System in Quezon City, Metro Manila, Philippines
Roosevelt station (Sound Transit), a station on the Link light rail system in Seattle, Washington, United States